The 2nd FINA World Swimming Championships (25 m) was an international swimming meet held on Copacabana Beach in Rio de Janeiro, Brazil, 30 November until 3 December 1995. The meet featured 32 events swum in a short course (25m) pool.

The United States did poorly, as the meet dates fell in the middle (rather than the end) of the USA's annual competition season (particularly the college season), the USA had just hosted the 1995 Pan Pacs, and the USA would host the 1996 Summer Olympics.

Participating nations
350 swimmers participate at the meet, from 57 nations.

Results

Men's events

Women's events

Medal standings

References

FINA World Swimming Championships (25 m)
FINA World Swimming Championship
S
International sports competitions in Rio de Janeiro (city)
Swimming
Swimming competitions in Brazil
December 1995 sports events in South America